Basil Al-Bahrani (born 23 January 1995) is a Saudi Arabian professional footballer who plays as a goalkeeper for Al-Batin. Apart from being a professional footballer, he is one of the owners of Al Othaim Mall.

Career
Al-Bahrani began his career at the youth team of Al-Fateh. On 10 August 2017, he was called up to the bench for the first time. On 22 August 2019, Al-Bahrani signed his first professional contract with the club. On 13 January 2021, Al-Bahrani renewed his contract with Al-Fateh. On 13 February 2021, Al-Bahrani made his league debut against Al-Ain. On 28 July 2022, Al-Bahrani was released from his contract by Al-Fateh. On 1 August 2022, Al-Bahrani joined Al-Batin.

Business Owner
On the 5th of August 2019, Al-Bahrani became an owner of the Al Othaim Mall, following his grandfather's passing on the 4th of August 2019, his grandfather being one of the founding members of the mall.

References

External links 
 

1995 births
Living people
Saudi Arabian footballers
People from Al-Hasa
Association football goalkeepers
Al-Fateh SC players
Al Batin FC players
Saudi Professional League players